Murray James Pierce (born 1 November 1957) is a former New Zealand rugby union player who played as a lock forward. He won 26 caps for the All Blacks between 1984 and 1989 and played in the victorious New Zealand team at the 1987 Rugby World Cup. Pierce made his debut for the All Blacks in the 1984 tour to Australia and Fiji. In addition to his 26 international test caps, he played 28 additional games for the All Blacks. Pierce was also a sworn member of the New Zealand Police as were a number of other All Blacks of his era, such as John Gallagher.

References

External links

1957 births
Living people
New Zealand international rugby union players
New Zealand rugby union players
New Zealand police officers
People educated at Waitaki Boys' High School
People educated at Dunstan High School
Rugby union players from Timaru
Rugby union locks